The European pond turtle (Emys orbicularis), also called commonly the European pond terrapin and the European pond tortoise, is a species of long-living freshwater turtle in the family Emydidae. The species is endemic to the Western Palearctic.

Subspecies
The following 14 subspecies are recognized as being valid.
Emys orbicularis capolongoi  – Sardinian pond turtle
Emys orbicularis colchica  – Colchis pond turtle
Emys orbicularis eiselti  – Eiselt's pond turtle
Emys orbicularis fritzjuergenobstii  – Obst's pond turtle
Emys orbicularis galloitalica  – Italian pond turtle
Emys orbicularis hellenica  – western Turkey pond turtle
Emys orbicularis hispanica  – Spanish pond turtle
Emys orbicularis iberica  – Kura Valley pond turtle
Emys orbicularis ingauna 
Emys orbicularis lanzai  – Corsican pond turtle
Emys orbicularis luteofusca  – central Turkey pond turtle
Emys orbicularis occidentalis  – North African pond turtle
Emys orbicularis orbicularis  – common European pond turtle

Emys orbicularis persica  – eastern pond turtle

A trinomial authority in parentheses indicates that the subspecies was originally described in a genus other than Emys.

Etymology

The subspecific name eiselti is in honor of Viennese herpetologist Josef Eiselt (1912–2001).

The subspecific name fritzjuergenobsti is in honor of German herpetologist Fritz Jürgen Obst (1939–2018).

The subspecific name lanzai is in honor of Italian herpetologist Benedetto Lanza.

Range and habitat

E. orbicularis is found in southern and central Europe, West Asia and North Africa. In France, there are six large remaining populations, all deteriorating; it is the most endangered reptile of the country. In Switzerland, the European pond turtle was extinct at the beginning of the twentieth century and reintroduced since 2010.In the early post-glacial period, the European pond turtle had a much wider distribution, being found as far north as southern Sweden and the UK, where a reintroduction has been proposed by Celtic Reptile & Amphibian.

Fossil evidence shows that E. orbicularis and Testudo hermanni were both present in Sardinia during the Pleistocene, but molecular evidence suggests the extant populations of both species on the island were  introduced in recent times.

E. orbicularis prefers to live in wetlands surrounded by a large proportion of natural, wooded, landscape. It also feeds in upland environments.

Biology

Morphology 

The carapace is dark brown to blackish, with a hint of green. The head and legs are spotted with yellow. The plastron is yellowish.

An important factor that affects the development of E. orbicularis is temperature and thermal conditions. It has been reported that differential growth rates of the same species occur, including variation of body size and clutch size, because of varying temperatures in certain areas. Due to evident patterns of sexual dimorphism, E. orbicularis adult males are always found to be smaller than females. In males, smaller plastra offer them a wider mobility compared to females. In females, due to their differential diet and foraging habits, there may be a correlation to an adaptive effect on their skull and head morphology.

Diet

E. orbicularis eats a mixed diet of plants and animal matter that can increase the efficiency of its digestive process. It has been reported that an adult's diet starts from a carnivorous diet and progresses to a more herbivorous diet as it ages and grows in size. This is similar to other omnivore emydid turtles. As E. orbicularis grows in age and becomes an adult, the amount of plant material consumption increases during the post breeding period. E. orbicularis may prefer less energetic food after the breeding season, a period of time where most of its energy is spent to recover from reproduction.

Nesting

The search of a nesting areas by adult females can last several hours to more than one day. Once the location of the nest is established, females spend time for the construction of the nest, laying of the eggs, and closing the nest which can take up to another 4 hours.

Nest fidelity is a characteristic that female European pond turtles carry out by selecting a nesting site based on its ecological characteristics and then return there for future expeditions so long as the site has not changed. E. orbicularis females tend to change to another nesting site if there are visible changes to the present environment or because of dietary changes. If an E. orbicularis female must change from nest to nest, it will typically select a site in close proximity. In addition, females can also lay eggs in an abandoned nesting site if the conditions change to become better suited for egg survival. If the ecological characteristics of the nesting site changes, this may influence the survival of the hatchlings and their sex ratio. Due to ecological changes such as trees growing to shade the nest, this can change the environment into an inadequate location for egg incubation. Females that do not exhibit nesting fidelity and lay eggs in the same area for long periods of time, even with the ecological changes, may produce large proportions of males as vegetation grows and nesting areas become more shaded. Since the sex of these turtles is temperature-dependent, a change in temperature may produce a larger number of males or females which may upset the sex ratio.

Mortality

Climate has an effect on the survival of E. orbicularis hatchlings. Hatchlings are only able to survive under favorable weather conditions, but due to regular annual clutch sizes and long lifespan, E. orbicularis adults, along with many freshwater turtles, balance out loss of hatchlings due to climate.

The species E. orbicularis has become rare in most countries even though it is widely distributed in Europe. The building of roads and driving of cars through natural habitats is a possible factor that threatens the populations of the European pond turtle. Road networks and traffic often carry complex ecological effects to animal populations such as fragmenting natural habitats and creating barriers for animal movement. Mortality on the road is most likely due to females selecting nests near roads which places a potential danger for the hatchlings as well. Hatchlings that wander too closely to roads are more likely to be killed and put the future population in danger. Although the possibility of roads being a major causation for the mortality of E. orbicularis is a rare phenomenon, long-term monitoring is necessary.

Introduced exotic species such as Trachemys scripta scripta and T. s. elegans, known commonly as Florida turtles, also put in danger the native Emys species in many parts of Spain (and possibly in other parts of southern Europe), since these exotic turtles are bigger and heavier than the native pond turtles. The usual life span of E. orbicularis is 40–60 years. It can live over 100 years, but such longevity is rare.

Parasites

E. orbicularis hosts several species of parasites, including Haemogregarina stepanovi, monogeneans of the genus Polystomoides, vascular trematodes of the genus Spirhapalum, and many nematode species.

Human impact

Historically, E. orbicularis had been maintained as pets; however, this practice has been restricted due to protection laws. Ownership of wild caught specimens is prohibited. Only registered captive bred specimens may be owned by private individuals. Due to human impact, the European pond turtle has been found to be relocated in areas distant from its origin. However, it is possible to localize and indicate a region of origin with genetic testing.

See also

 List of reptiles of Europe

References

Further reading

Arnold EN, Burton JA (1978). A Field Guide to the Reptiles and Amphibians of Britain and Europe. (With 351 illustrations, 257 in colour by D.W. Ovenden). London: Collins. 272 pp. + Plates 1-40. . (Emys orbicularis, p. 93 + Plate 14, figure 1 + Map 48).
Boulenger GA (1889). Catalogue of the Chelonians, Rhynchocephalians, and Crocodiles in the British Museum (Natural History). New Edition. London: Trustees of the British Museum (Natural History). (Taylor and Francis, printers). x + 311 pp. + Plates I-III. (Emys orbicularis, pp. 112–114).
Linnaeus C (1758). Systema naturæ per regna tria naturæ, secundum classes, ordines, genera, species, cum characteribus, differentiis, synonymis, locis. Tomus I. Editio Decima, Reformata. Stockholm: L. Salvius. 824 pp. (Testudo orbicularis, new species, p. 198). (in Latin).

External links

 Emys orbicularis
 ARKive - images and movies of the European pond turtle (Emys orbicularis)
 Emys orbicularis in The Reptile Database
 http://politiken.dk/indland/ECE36862/gaaden-om-de-danske-sumpskildpadder/

Emys
Turtles of Europe
Turtles of Asia
Turtles of Africa
Reptiles of the Middle East
Turtle, European pond
Turtle, European pond
Near threatened biota of Europe
Reptiles described in 1758
Taxa named by Carl Linnaeus
Reptiles of Russia